Movin' Wes is an album by the American jazz guitarist Wes Montgomery, released in 1964. It reached number 18 on the Billboard jazz albums chart in 1967, his second album to reach the charts after Bumpin'.

History
Movin' Wes was Montgomery's debut album on the Verve label. Produced by Creed Taylor, the album sold more than 100,000 copies initially; it was Montgomery's biggest seller to this point in his career.

Reception 

In his AllMusic review, Scott Yanow wrote: "Wes Montgomery's debut for Verve, although better from a jazz standpoint than his later A&M releases, is certainly in the same vein. The emphasis is on his tone, his distinctive octaves, and his melody statements."

Track listing
"Caravan" (Duke Ellington, Irving Mills, Juan Tizol) – 2:39
"People" (Bob Merrill, Jule Styne) – 4:23
"Movin' Wes, Pt. 1" (Wes Montgomery) – 3:31
"Moça Flor" (Durval Ferreira, Lula Freire) – 3:12
"Matchmaker, Matchmaker" (Jerry Bock, Sheldon Harnick) – 2:52
"Movin' Wes, Pt. 2" (Montgomery) – 2:55
"Senza Fine" (Gino Paoli, Alec Wilder) – 3:28
"Theodora" (Billy Taylor) – 3:58
"In and Out" (Montgomery) – 2:53
"Born to Be Blue" (Mel Tormé, Robert Wells) – 3:40
"West Coast Blues" (Montgomery) – 3:12

Personnel
Wes Montgomery – guitar
Ernie Royal – trumpet
Clark Terry – trumpet
Snooky Young – trumpet
Jimmy Cleveland – trombone
Urbie Green – trombone
Quentin Jackson – trombone
Chauncey Welsch – trombone
Don Butterfield – tuba
Harvey Phillips – tuba
Jerome Richardson – woodwinds
Bobby Scott – piano
Bob Cranshaw – bass
Grady Tate – drums
Willie Bobo – percussion

Production
Creed Taylor – producer
Rudy Van Gelder – engineer
Phil Ramone – engineer
Johnny Pate – arranger, conductor

Chart positions

References

Wes Montgomery albums
1964 albums
Albums produced by Creed Taylor
Verve Records albums
Albums conducted by Johnny Pate
Albums arranged by Johnny Pate